Jason Calvin Pooley (born 8 August 1969) is a former cricketer, who represented Middlesex County Cricket Club in the County Championship. Pooley is now retired from cricket.

A left-handed batsman, Pooley played 82 first-class matches and 103 List A matches.

"He did not appear after 1998, when he was in effect a one-day specialist, becoming the second team coach in which role he continued to appear for the 2nd XI. He was also assistant coach to John Emburey."

Pooley's highest first-class score was 138* versus Cambridge University. His highest score against a county was 136, against Gloucestershire.

Pooley now lives with his wife and three children. His brother, Gregg, played second XI cricket for a number of counties.

References

External links
 

Middlesex cricketers
English cricketers of 1969 to 2000
1969 births
Living people
English cricketers
People from Hammersmith